Max Ruhbeck (1 September 1858 – 2 November 1945) was a German actor. He appeared in more than ninety films from 1915 to 1923.

Selected filmography

References

External links 

1858 births
1945 deaths
German male stage actors
German male film actors
20th-century German male actors